The Governor Alfred E. Driscoll Bridge, also known as the Driscoll Bridge is a toll bridge (with a series of three spans) on the Garden State Parkway in the U.S. state of New Jersey spanning the Raritan River near its mouth in Raritan Bay. The bridge connects the Middlesex County communities of Woodbridge Township on the north with Sayreville on the south.  With a total of 15 travel lanes and 6 shoulder lanes, it is the widest motor vehicle bridge in the world by number of lanes and one of the world's busiest. Only 30 feet east of the Driscoll Bridge are the Vieser and Edison Bridges, which carry U.S. Route 9 southbound and northbound, respectively.

History
The northbound lanes of the bridge were opened to the public without fanfare on July 30, 1954. The bridge was formally renamed in 1974 for former Governor Alfred E. Driscoll, who advocated for and oversaw the construction of the Garden State Parkway, as well as for the New Jersey Turnpike.

The original span was built with two lanes in each direction. A second span was added in 1972, with each span serving five lanes of traffic.

The bridge had very narrow lanes which created traffic bottlenecks for miles in each direction on the Garden State Parkway, until it was widened. The bridge was later restriped to have twelve ten-foot lanes, six in each direction.

Construction on a new southbound bridge started on September 25, 2002, and the new bridge opened to traffic on May 3, 2006. The existing span was then closed for rehabilitation, and it reopened on May 20, 2009. The new configuration has seven southbound lanes on the newly constructed span, and the original span has eight lanes and carries northbound traffic only. The northbound span is also divided, with four lanes on each side. The west side contains four lanes for through traffic on the Parkway, and the east side contains three lanes for Exit 127 of the Parkway and one lane for through traffic.

The speed limit on the Garden State Parkway was previously 45 mph approaching and traversing the Driscoll Bridge. However, in February 2020, the speed limit was raised to 55 mph.

This bridge contains views of some of the taller buildings in the lower Manhattan Skyline, the New Brunswick skyline, the Verrazzano-Narrows Bridge, and the Outerbridge Crossing.

Tolls
All southbound traffic crossing the Driscoll Bridge pays a toll at either the Raritan Toll Plaza or at exit 125 on the Garden State Parkway, which is just north of the toll plaza. As of January 1, 2023, the toll for passenger cars at the Raritan Toll Plaza is $2.10 with cash and $2.02 with E-ZPass. Southbound exit 125 is for E-ZPass users only and also has a toll of $2.02.

Murder on the bridge
On February 17, 2010, Shamshiddin Abdur-Raheem was sentenced to life in prison for the murder of his daughter by throwing her off the bridge. The body of an infant matching the girl's description was found on the south bank of the Raritan River on April 24 and was later identified as the missing girl through DNA testing.

See also
List of crossings of the Raritan River

References

External links

The History and Technology of the Edison Bridge & Driscoll Bridge

Garden State Parkway
Toll bridges in New Jersey
Bridges completed in 1954
Bridges completed in 1972
Bridges over the Raritan River
Bridges in Middlesex County, New Jersey
Road bridges in New Jersey
Sayreville, New Jersey
Woodbridge Township, New Jersey
Box girder bridges in the United States
1954 establishments in New Jersey